Charles Sirois,  (born May 22, 1954) is a Canadian businessman. He is the founder, controlling shareholder, chairman and CEO of Telesystem Ltd., a Canadian private equity firm. Effective from March 1, 2017, he has been the CEO and chairman of OnMobile Global Ltd, India

In 2011, he co-founded (with François Legault) a social and economic liberal centre-right political party, Coalition Avenir Québec.

Early life and education
Born in Chicoutimi, Quebec, he earned a bachelor's degree in Finance from Université de Sherbrooke and a master's degree in finance from Université Laval. He is the father of François-Charles Sirois and grandfather of Maxime Sirois.

Business career
Sirois has had a long career in corporate management. He is currently a director of the Canadian Imperial Bank of Commerce, Cossette Communication Group and Orchestre Symphonique de Montreal. He led BCE Mobile Communications from 1988 to 1990 as its chairman and CEO. Subsequently, he was chairman and CEO of Teleglobe, the leading provider of international long-distance and broadband services in Canada. He also served as chairman of Telesystem International Wireless, and founded and was chairman of Microcell Telecommunications, a GSM cellular provider in Canada best known for its Fido brand name. He was also a member of the G8 Dot Force, of the National Broadband Task Force, and was a founding member of the Washington-based Global Information Infrastructure Commission (GIIC).

Sirois is known within investment circles for his purchase of Excel Communications in 1998.  Excel, which was a reseller of residential long-distance services, relied on door-to-door sales and multi-level marketing. While Sirois was able to sell Teleglobe to Bell Canada in 2000 at a price of $6.5 billion, the subsequent bursting of the internet bubble and telecom bust forced Teleglobe into bankruptcy in 2002 and the writedown of $2.1 billion of Excel.

Sirois is one of the founding partners of Enablis and has served as its chairman and chief executive officer from inception.

Sirois had a net worth of C$1.2 billion in 2015.

Honours
In 1994, he was made a member of the Order of Canada in recognition for being "a visionary in the area of intercontinental communications". In 1998, he was made a Knight of the National Order of Quebec.

He holds honorary doctorates from Université du Québec à Montréal, University of Ottawa, Concordia University, Université Laval and the École de technologie supérieure.

Published work
In 1995, he published a book on the information highway entitled "The Medium and the Muse". In his second book, published in June 2000, "Organic Management: Creating a Culture of Innovation", Sirois shares his management philosophy, along with his vision of the new economy.

References

 

1954 births
Businesspeople from Quebec
Canadian male non-fiction writers
Canadian political party founders
Directors of the Canadian Imperial Bank of Commerce
Knights of the National Order of Quebec
Living people
Members of the Order of Canada
Writers from Saguenay, Quebec
Université de Sherbrooke alumni
Université Laval alumni
Coalition Avenir Québec politicians
21st-century Canadian politicians
20th-century Canadian non-fiction writers
20th-century Canadian male writers
21st-century Canadian non-fiction writers
21st-century Canadian male writers